Masi are glutinous rice balls with a peanut and muscovado filling from Cebu, Philippines. It is made from sweetened galapong (ground soaked glutinous rice) shaped into little balls with a filling of chopped roasted peanuts and muscovado or brown sugar. It is then boiled in water until it floats. It can also be steamed. It is traditionally sold wrapped in banana leaves. Masi can be modified to use different fillings, like chocolate or peanut butter. Coconut milk may also be used to give the dough a creamier flavor.

Masi is sometimes anglicized as peanut rice balls. Masi is related to the Tagalog mache and the Kapampangan moche, which are prepared similarly.

See also
Kakanin
Palitaw
Sapin sapin

References

External links

Rice dishes
Philippine desserts
Philippine rice dishes
Foods containing coconut